"Powerless (Say What You Want)"  is a song by Canadian singer-songwriter Nelly Furtado from her second studio album, Folklore (2003). The song was written and produced by Furtado, Gerald Eaton, and Brian West. It contains a sample of Malcolm McLaren's "Buffalo Gals", which was written by Trevor Horn, Anne Dudley, and Malcolm McLaren. The song was released as the album's lead single in October 2003.

Background
"Powerless (Say What You Want)" addresses how Furtado was discriminated against as her record company wanted to hide her ancestry: "Paint my face in your magazines/Make it look whiter than it seems/Paint me over with your dreams/Shove away my ethnicity". According to Furtado, "I noticed that when I turned on the TV, I didn't really see anybody that looked like me. So it's really important for me to keep that realness in me and always remember where I came from, while at the same time always entertaining people. I like music to be inclusive." Furtado also commented on gaining strength through the things that are truly important, saying that "real power comes from not caring about power and just letting yourself be free" and affirming that it is "good to have balance in life".

Of the instrumentation, Furtado said: "I get to see a lot of DJ-oriented performance stuff, and I'm into the heaviness of breakbeats, how raw and powerful they are. Everything lately has become so synthesized, but just the standard sound of breakbeats is inspiring. 'Powerless' uses breakbeats like that; it's a real groove, a real vibe. It just carries you away. There’s a banjo mixed with a breakbeat from elements of Malcolm McLaren's 'Buffalo Gals.' So right away you're bobbing your head. The lyrics are initially in-your-face, like, 'Okay, I know I'm going to be stereotyped in my life because that is the world we live in; that's society.' But the song tries to find some sense of order in this complicated world." 

The song was named 'Single of the Year' at the 2004 Juno Awards.

Music video
The music video was directed by Bryan Barber and was shot over three days. The video revolves around a classic psychological metaphor: Furtado trapped inside a box from which she seeks to escape. Inside, the box is plastered with posters that act as doors or windows for the artist's imagination. Her situation is a metaphor for being both defined and confined by the illusory commercial reality of her celebrity and beauty. The video was shot on various sets and dressed locations, and in a large customized box crate, which were all created by production designer Aaron Goffman. Using Photoshop and Illustrator, Moneyshots designed the posters and graphics that surround Furtado in the box and added the transitions that transport her back and forth between the imprisoning box and the poster environments that signify the escape that self-expression can bring. There is an alternate version of the video featuring Furtado in a field, and shown in several screens in different parts of a city, showing the movements of the modern life.

Track listing
UK CD single
 "Powerless (Say What You Want)" (album version) – 3:53
 "Powerless (Say What You Want)" (Josh – Desi remix) – 3:12
 "Powerless (Say What You Want)" (alternative acoustic mix) – 3:47

German 2-track single
 "Powerless (Say What You Want)" (album version) – 3:53
 "Powerless (Say What You Want)" (alternative acoustic mix) – 3:47

German 4-track single
 "Powerless (Say What You Want)" (album version) – 3:53
 "Powerless (Say What You Want)" (alternative acoustic mix) – 3:47
 "Powerless (Say What You Want)" (Josh Desi remix) – 3:47
 "Powerless (Say What You Want)" (instrumental version) – 3:53

Credits and personnel
Credits are lifted from the Folklore album booklet.

Studios
 Recorded at The Gymnasium (Santa Monica, California) and Metalworks Studios (Mississauga, Canada)
 Mastered at Bernie Grundman Mastering (Hollywood, California)

Personnel

 Nelly Furtado – writing, lead and background vocals, production
 Gerald Eaton – writing
 Brian West – writing, engineering
 Trevor Horn – writing ("Buffalo Gals")
 Anne Dudley – writing ("Buffalo Gals")
 Malcolm McLaren – writing ("Buffalo Gals")
 Track & Field – production, programming
 Track – flange guitar,  electric harmonium (left-hand)
 Field – electric harmonium (right-hand)
 James Bryan – acoustic guitar
 Steve Carnelli – banjo, mandolin
 Mike Elizondo – Echoplex slide guitar
 Brad Haehnel – mixing, engineering
 Joe Labatto – engineering
 Steve Chahley – engineering assistance
 Ian Bodzasi – engineering assistance
 Brian "Big Bass" Gardner – mastering

Charts

Weekly charts

Year-end charts

Release history

References

External links
"Powerless (Say What You Want)" Music Video - YouTube

2003 singles
Music videos directed by Bryan Barber
Nelly Furtado songs
Songs written by Anne Dudley
Songs written by Trevor Horn
Songs written by Nelly Furtado
Songs written by Brian West (musician)
Songs written by Gerald Eaton
2003 songs
DreamWorks Records singles
Juno Award for Single of the Year singles
Songs written by Malcolm McLaren
Songs against racism and xenophobia